Metaprotus is a genus of moths of the family Crambidae.

Species
Metaprotus asuridia Butler, 1886
Metaprotus magnifica (Meyrick, 1887)

References

Pyraustinae
Crambidae genera
Taxa named by George Hampson